The discography of Michael W. Smith, an American contemporary Christian musician, consists of 15 studio albums and 80 singles as well as multiple holiday albums, compilation albums, instrumental albums, and video releases. Smith has sold over 18 million albums as of May 2018. He has recorded more top-ten albums on the Billboard Christian Albums chart (31) than any other artist, and his 16 No. 1 albums on the chart are second only to Amy Grant.

In 1982, Smith was hired as a keyboardist for Grant and began writing and performing on her albums as well as touring with her as an opening act at her concerts. His first album, Michael W. Smith Project (1983), charted at No. 9 on the Billboard  Christian Albums chart and was his first album to be certified gold by the Recording Industry Association of America (RIAA). His next albums, Michael W. Smith 2 (1984) and The Big Picture (1986), also charted in the top ten, but attempts to market The Big Picture to mainstream audiences did not succeed. I 2 (EYE) (1988) became Smith's first No. 1 album on the Christian Albums chart and his second gold album, and seven of its singles reached the top ten on the CCM Update Christian radio charts.

Go West Young Man (1990) became Smith's first album to chart on the Billboard 200, and the singles "Place in This World" and "For You" peaked at Nos. 6 and 60 on the Billboard Hot 100. The album was certified platinum by the RIAA and certified gold by Music Canada. Change Your World (1992) and I'll Lead You Home (1995) also received platinum certifications. "I Will Be Here for You", the lead single from Change Your World, topped the adult contemporary charts in the United States and Canada while charting at No. 8 in Canada and No. 27 on the Hot 100, and I'll Lead You Home was the first Christian album to debut in the top 20 on the Billboard 200.

Live the Life (1998), This Is Your Time (1999), and Healing Rain (2004) all received gold certifications; other gold-certified albums include the compilation album The First Decade (1983–1993) (1993), the holiday albums Christmas (1989) and Christmastime (1998), and the instrumental release Freedom (2000). Smith's live albums Worship (2001) and Worship Again (2002) have been certified double platinum and platinum, respectively, by the RIAA. His album Sovereign (2014) debuted at No. 10 on the Billboard 200, his highest career ranking on the chart. His most recent studio album, A Million Lights (2018), was released a week apart from his live album Surrounded (2018); both albums charted at No. 2 on the Christian Albums chart.

Albums

Studio albums

Box sets

Compilation albums

Holiday albums

Instrumental albums

Live albums

Other albums

Videos

Singles

1980s

1990s

2000–present

As featured artist

Other charted songs

Notes

References

General

Specific

External links 
 

Discography
Discographies of American artists
Christian music discographies
Pop music discographies